Festival Stozhary is an international actors film festival which takes place in Kyiv, Ukraine. The name of the festival is an Old Slavonic counterpart for the asterism of Pleiades. In the mythology of ancient Greece Pleiads were the 7 beautiful daughters of the Titan Atlas and the sea-nymph Pleione. Turned into 7 birds by Zeus they later became 7 bright stars, which formed beautiful constellation.

The mysterious 7 became the code structure of the festival “Stozhary” – 7 days the festival lasts, 7 prizes the winners receive, 7 members of jury, 7 colors of rainbow which along with the winged Pleaiad-maid became the symbol of the festival.

Through the history of the festival - 1995, 1997, 1999, 2003, 2005, cinematographers from Russia, Belarus, Georgia, Latvia, Estonia, Moldavia, Poland, Serbia, Austria, Italy, Germany, USA and Ukraine were the guests and participants of the festival contest. The festival was covered by the media of Ukraine, Russia, Belarus and Poland.

The festival contributes to strengthening and intensification of the brotherhood of actors and provides for non-official, non-formal atmosphere in which cinematographers can resolve issues, gain new experiences, teach and learn, share inspiration, uphold each other and bring happiness to the spectators.

Actors film festival is different from traditional festival forums in that only the actors works and performances are the subject for its contest and jury assessment. For today International Film Festival Stozhary is the only international actors film festival in the world.

Festival history

Stozhary '95
1st Open Actors Film Festival Stozhary in Kyiv took place on August 22–28, 1995.

22 Ukrainian films produced since 1991 till 1995 took part in the contest. During the festival the score of press conferences, actor-audience meetings, round-table discussions and actors’ recitals (professional actors clubs) took place. 
The festival events were covered by the leading media of Ukraine and Russian TV companies. The series of Leonid Filatov TV program “O  kogo pomnim…” was filmed during the festival, covering the life and work of prominent Ukrainian cinematographers Ivan Nikolaychuk, Leonid Bikov, Nikolai Grinko. 
Meetings with actors, premiere screenings and other festival events took place in Kyiv, Slavutich and Dnepropetrovsk cities of Ukraine. 
The festival success drew attention of the Ukrainian government and international actors community.

Stozhary '95 jury
Jury chairman:
National Artist of the USSR Via Artmane
Jury  members: Raisa Nedashkivska (National Artist of Ukraine), Lev Perfilov (Honored artist of Ukraine), Svetlana Kruchkova, Igor Dmitriev, Vladimir Konkin, Elena Drapeko (National Artists of Russia).

Stozhary '95 Prize-Winners

Stozhary '95 Additional Awards

 Special Jury Prize: „To Director. For the High Professionalism in Work with an Actor”. Awarded to National Artist of Ukraine, director Nikolay Maschenko for the film „Marrying death”.
 Screen Actors Guild of Ukraine Special Prize: "To Actor. For the Great Contribution to Cinematography". Awarded to National Artist of Ukraine, Ada Rogovtseva; National Artist of Ukraine, Konstantin Stepankov; National Artist of Ukraine,
Ivan Gavriluk; National Artist of Ukraine, Natalia Naum.

Stozhary '97
2nd Open International Actors Film Festival Stozhary in Kyiv took place on August 30 - September 7, 1997.

Stozhary '97 was perfect international cinema celebration. The 2nd Stozhary festival invited more than 30 guests from CIS, Baltic States and Eastern Europe among which:

The Guests

Russia:

National Artists of Russia: Nikolai Karachentsov, Olga Kabo, Igor Bochkin, Vsevolod Shilovsky, Nikolai Burlyayev, Mikhail Svetin.

Actors: Andrey Ankudinov, Elena Tonunts.

Mark Rudinshtein (Festival “Kinotavr” General Producer).

Latvia: Ivars Kalniņš.

Georgia: Baadur Tsuladze (Honored Artist of Georgia, the President of Screen Actors Guild of Georgia).

Poland:

Film Director Jerzy Hoffman

Actors: Daniel Olbrychski, Barbara Brylska, Jerzy Zelnik.

Critics: Janusz Gazda, Danuta Suchowierska.

Serbia:

Yovan Markovic (Script writer and Film Director).

Actors: Elena Zhigon, Vera Trifonova-Muyovich, Ivanna Zhigon.

Belarus:

National Artists of Belarus: Vladimir Gostuhin, Svetlana Okruzhnaya. Svetlana Suhovey (Honored Artist of Belarus, the President of Screen Actors Guild of Belarus).

Stozhary '97 jury:

Jury chairman: Valeria Zaklunnaya (National Artist of Ukraine).

Jury  members: Barbara Brylska (Poland), Elena Zhigon (Serbia), Michael Svetin (Russia), Vladimir Gostuhin (Belarus), Ivars Kalniņš (Latvia), Michaylo Golubovich (Ukraine).

Stozhary '97 Prize-Winners

 Screen Actors Guild of Ukraine Special Prize: "To Actor. For the Great Contribution to Cinematography". Awarded to National Artists of Ukraine: Nikolay Olialin, Les Serdiuk, Raisa Nedashkivska, Larisa Kadochnikova, Lev Perfilov.

Testimony
Jerzy Hoffman
I feel great here, not only as an artist but just as I am, as a person. On the whole, I think the festivals are indispensable as they let artists meet, dispute, argue time to time, and sometimes just see each other face to face. It always brings something new. 
I am so much surprised, so surprised with what I saw here. And not only concerning organization, hospitality etc. But the entire atmosphere every evening, the ability to see all the interesting and great in the city, and the ability to see and communicate with each other face to face. 
I am glad! Really glad that the festival is here in Kyiv. 
Because its so important for us, the Poles, that the renascence of national spirituality, without which there could be no state and economic development happens this way. 
And may the Lord help you! That’s why I am with you, with my entire heart I am with you! 

Daniel Olbrychski
It is very important, very important because someone thinks of our profession. In order for the performance or the movie to take place there will be one person, a cameraman who will turn the camera on. What is more important – we need at least one spectator and an actor. 
And when we have millions of spectators the actors will always be talented, the key is the work and love of spectators.

Stozhary '99
3rd International Actors Film Festival Stozhary in Kyiv took place on October 12–20, 1999.

Strozhary ‘99 screened the films by Emir Kusturica, Srdjan Dragojevic, Kira Muratova, Krzysztof Zanussi and other prominent movie makers. The festival invited its respected guests from CIS, Baltic States and Eastern Europe.

The Guests

Russia: Igor Bochkin, Eugene Zharikov, Natalya Gvozdikova, Andrew Ankudinov, Galina Bokashevskaya, Natalya Varley, Oleg Onufriev.

Latvia: Ivars Kalnins.

Georgia: Baadur Tsuladze (Honored Artist of Georgia, the President of Screen Actors Guild of Georgia).

Poland: Daniel Olbrychski, Dorota Stalinska, Agnieszka Włodarczyk, Janusz Gazda, Danuta Suchowierska.

Serbia:
Yovan Markovic, Dragan Bjelogrlić, Lazar Ristovski, Alenka Rancic, Voja Miric, Dusan Pekic.

Belarus: Anatoliy Kotenev, Svetlana Suhovey, Svetlana Okruzhnaya.

Stozhary '99 jury

The festival jury was represented by 2 boards in 1999: the Actors Jury and the Critics Jury.

Actors Jury Chairman: Larisa Kadochnikova (National Artist of Ukraine).

Actors Jury members: Dorota Stakinska (Poland), Voya Miric (Serbia), Natalya Gvozdikova (National Artist of Russia), Baadur Tsuladze (Honored Artist of Georgia), Ivan Gavriluk (National Artist of Ukraine), Eve Kivi (National Artist of Estonia).

Critics Jury Chairman: Janusz Gazda

Critics Jury members: Valeria Gushchina (Russia), Alenka Ranchich (Serbia), Ludmila Lemesheva (Ukraine), Oksana Zabuzhko (Ukraine), Sergey Trimbach (Ukraine), Oksana Musienko (Ukraine).

Stozhary '99 Prize-Winners

 Special Prize: Crystal Bell "To Actor. For the Highest Creative Ascent". Awarded to the prominent figures in European Cinema: Bogdan Stupka (Ukraine), Daniel Olbrychski (Poland), Bata Živojinović (Serbia).
 Screen Actors Guild of Ukraine Special Prize: "To Actor. For the Great Contribution to Cinematography". Awarded to Margarita Krinitsina (National Artist of Ukraine) and Georgiy Drozd (National Artist of Ukraine).

Stozhary 2003

4th International Actors Film Festival Stozhary in Kyiv, August 22–28, 2003.

For the first time in the festival Stozhary history the philosophic round-table discussions took place. Headed by Nazip Hamitov (Ph. D., professor, author and radio programme host, writer, script writer and psychoanalyst) the discussions analysed wide spectrum of issues involving: "Eros and Thanatos in cinema", "The Evolution of Masculine and Feminine", "Masculinization of a Woman and Feminization of a Man", "Love Metamorphoses in Cinema on the Turn of Millennia: passion, friendship, co-creativity".

The Guests
Russia:

Stanislav Govorukhin (famous film director, MP), Elena Drapeko (National Artist of Russia, MP), Kirill Razlogov (Director of The Russian Institute for Cultural Research), Natalia Viko (writer, script writer), Valeia Gushchina (Director of the Screen Actors Guild of Russia).

Actors: Andrew Ankudinov, Sergey Glushko, Olga Filippova.

Georgia: Baadur Tsuladze (Honored Artist of Georgia), Niko Tavadze.

USA-Georgia: Levan Uchaneishvili.

Poland: 
 Actors: Piotr Adamczyk, Gabriela Kownacka.
 Arts critics: Janusz Gazda, Danuta Suchowierska.

Serbia: Yovan Markovic (script writer, film director); Elena Golubovic, Katarina Radivojević.

Belarus: Svetlana Suhovey (Honored Artist of Belarus), Svetlana Zelenkovskaya, Anatoly Kot.

Contest Films:

                 
Stozhary 2003 jury:

For the first time the festival jury was merged into single body involving the critics and the actors.

Jury Chairman: Raisa Nedashkovskaya (National Artist of Ukraine).

Jury members: Baadur Tsuladze, Janusz Gazda, Yovan Markovic, Kirill Razlogov, Nikolay Olialin (National Artist of Ukraine), Andrew Kurkov, Sergey Trimbatch, Ludmila Lemesheva.

Stozhary 2003 Prize-Winners

 Special Jury Diploma: "For the Personification of Classic Image of a Woman in a Modern Way" in the film "Carmen" by Alexander Hvan. Awarded to Olga Filippova.
 Special Jury Diploma: "For Brilliant Presentation of a National Image" in the film "Zona Zamfirova" by Alexander Hvan. Awarded to Katarina Radivojević.
 Festival Executive Committee Special Prize: "Mother". Awarded to Stanislav Govorukhin, the founder of the alternative festival movement in Soviet and Pos-Soviet time.

Stozhary 2005

The form of the 5th International Actors Film Festival Stozhary (September 25–30, 2005) was slightly altered in 2005. The festival was given a new motto: "The Secret of Unfettered Mind." The rainbow, which symbolizes the clear light of human aura, became the official image of the festival.

The festival themes were made more specific in 2005 focusing the selection process on the films which tell of human spirituality, spiritual search and love. For the first time since its inception the festival received guests from Austria, Germany and Italy inviting Western European cinematographers to compete in the festival contest.

General list of films screened during the festival in 2005

Stozhary 2005 jury

The festival jury was again represented by 2 boards.

Actors Jury: Marina Mogilevskaya (Chairman, Russia), Vladimir Goryansky (Ukraine), Alexander Pankratov-Cherniy (Russia), Nikita Dzhigurda (Russia), Vera Trifonova-Mujovic (Serbia), Svetlana Zelenkovskaya (Belarus).

Critics Jury: Nazip Hamitov (Chairman), Ludmila Lemesheva (Ukraine), Yovan Markovic (Serbia), Yulia Monahova (Russia), Svetlana Krilova (Ukraine).

Stozhary 2005 Prize-Winners

In the context of the festival complementary programs the series of activities took place:

 Round-table discussions: "Unfettered Mind: infernal to divine." Author and the host - Nazip Hamitov (Ph. D., professor, psychoanalyst). The films "Ainoa" by Marco Kalantari and "Insatiability" by Wiktor Grodecki were the key subjects for discussions which involved the dialogues with the filmmakers and the actors in key roles, and the film psychoanalysis.
 Close-up meeting: "Politics in the Cinema". Participants: Stanislav Govorukhin, Daniel Olbrychski, Jan Machulski, Baadur Tsuladze.
 Masterclasses: Georgy Deliev, Baadur Tsuladze, Nikita Dzhigurda.

Panorama
Along with the films which compete in the contest festival Stozhary also demonstrates hors concours movies. The panorama participants do not compete and are awarded precise diplomas based on the jury's decision.

The Stars of the Day to Come:

"The Stars of the Day to Come" is the festival panorama section which screens the works of children and younger actors under 16.

In 2005 the diplomas were awarded to:

 Special Jury Diploma: "For the highest professionalism in reflecting the depths of the human "Self." Awarded to Lazar Ristovski (Serbia) for the film "Midwinter's Night Dream" by director Goran Paskaljević.
 Special Jury Prize: "For the personification of love saving the world." Awarded to Verena Buratti (Italy) for the film "Ainoa" by director Marco Kalantari.
 Special Jury Diploma: "For disclosing infernal sides of the human being." Awarded to Cezary Pazura (Poland) for the film "Nienasycenie" by director Wiktor Grodecki.
 Special Jury Diploma: "For the highest professionalism in revealing the spirituality a contemporary person." Awarded to Baadur Tsuladze (Georgia) for the films "Tbilisi, Tbilisi" by Levan Zakareishvili, "Bereg" by Konstantin Denesuk, "The Prayer of Leyla" by Satibaldy Narimbetov.
 Special Prize: Crystal Bell "To Actor. For the Highest Creative Ascent". Awarded to Nikolay Olialin (National Artist of Ukraine).

Festival nominations
Key Nominations
 Best actor in a leading role
 Best actress in a leading role
 Best actor in a supporting role
 Best actress in a supporting role
 Best non-professional actor
 Best debut 
 Best episode.
Secondary Nominations
 Best actor in short film
 Best young actor.

Festival Goals
 to provide for professional, creative "actors workshop" - an atmosphere of absolute mental and emotional trust;
 to view the works and see the views of experts and young colleagues from CIS, Baltic States and Europe;
 to draw interest to new attainments of movie makers;
 to provide for development of culture of cinema in Ukraine;
 to demonstrate the works of European movie experts, their search for new language and technologies in cinema art.

References

External links
 - Official site of the festival Stozhary

Film festivals in Ukraine
Annual events in Ukraine